The Vivaldi Residences Davao is a 37-storey residential tower located at the corner of C.M. Recto Street and R. Magsaysay Avenue in Davao City, Philippines. Upon completion, this building will be the tallest in Davao City as well as in Mindanao.

Construction
The building's foundation works was commenced in June 2015. The bored piles were laid by Advanced Foundation Construction Systems. By March 2016, the foundation works is 95 percent complete with 67 out of 70 bored piles already laid. The building is scheduled to be completed in April 2018.

Architecture and design

See also
Vivaldi Residences Cubao

References

External links
 Euro Towers International

Residential condominiums in the Philippines
Buildings and structures in Davao City